Shkodër railway station is the main railway station in Shkodër County, Albania. It is the northernmost passenger station in Albania.

Shkodër was first reached by rail when a 34 km long extension from Lezhë was completed in 1981 using raw materials imported from Morocco. Passenger services began on 25 January 1982. In 1985, a long-anticipated connection with the international railway network was affected with a further extension (opened to regular traffic in 1986) from Shkodër to Tuzi in Montenegro via Bajzë and Han i Hotit, providing Albania with its only international railway link, though it has never carried passengers.

In the early 1990s, trains ran twice daily between Shkodër and Durrës, though by 2015–16, this had been reduced to one train each way.

In 2012, a train that departed from Shkodër caught fire, but there were no fatalities or injured persons. Shkodër railway station will close if there is no investment. As of 2/5/2020 the station seems to be closed on Google Maps.

References

Railway stations in Albania
Buildings and structures in Shkodër
Railway stations opened in 1981